Dower is a surname. Notable people with the surname include:

Alan Dower (1898–1980), British Army officer and politician
Dai Dower (1933–2016), British boxer
Eric Gandar Dower (1894–1987), Scottish politician and businessman
George Dower (1913–1974), Australian rules footballer
Jeremy Dower (born 1976), Australian musician and artist
John Gordon Dower (1900–1947), British civil servant and architect
John W. Dower (born 1938), American writer and historian
Natalie Dower (born 1931), English artist
Robert Dower (1876–1964), South African cricketer
Sam Dower (born 1999), American basketball player

See also
Kenneth Gandar-Dower (1908–1944), English sportsman, aviator, explorer and writer
Johnny Dowers (born 1971), American actor, writer and musician